Evil is an American supernatural drama television series created by Robert and Michelle King that premiered on September 26, 2019, on CBS. The series is produced by CBS Studios and King Size Productions. The series features an ensemble cast led by Katja Herbers, Mike Colter, and Aasif Mandvi. Kurt Fuller, Marti Matulis, Brooklyn Shuck, Skylar Gray, Maddy Crocco, Dalya Knapp, Christine Lahti, Michael Emerson, Ashley Edner and Andrea Martin also star.

In October 2019, the series was renewed for a second season. In May 2021, it was confirmed that the series would move from CBS to Paramount+. The second season premiered on June 20, 2021. In July 2021, the series was renewed for a third season which premiered on June 12, 2022, and concluded on August 14, 2022. In July 2022, the series was renewed for a fourth season.

Evil has received critical acclaim, with particular praise for its acting, characters, writing, direction, and cinematography.

Premise
A skeptical forensic psychologist (Herbers) allies with a Catholic seminarian (Colter) and a similarly sceptical technology contractor (Mandvi) to investigate purported supernatural incidents.

Cast and characters

Main
 Katja Herbers as Dr. Kristen Bouchard, a forensic psychologist hired by David Acosta to help him distinguish between legitimate instances of demonic possession and insanity. Kristen is not religious and does not believe in demons or the supernatural, but finds her skepticism tested many times as she walks a thin line between what science can account for and what it has yet to explain.
 Mike Colter as David Acosta, a former journalist studying to be a Catholic priest. He currently works as an assessor, tasked with investigating and confirming events such as miracles and reports of demons. He takes hallucinogens in order to see visions, but he is not sure if they are from God or his own mind.
 Aasif Mandvi as Ben Shakir, a contractor who works with David as his technical expert and equipment handler. He plays devil's advocate, providing scientific explanations for supernatural phenomena.
 Kurt Fuller as Dr. Kurt Boggs, a psychiatrist and Kristen's therapist
 Marti Matulis as George, a demon who appears to Kristen in her dreams. Matulis portrays many of the other demons and creatures in the series, including the AR Demon in "Rose390", one of the Ghoul Orderlies in "Room 320", Townsend's Devil Therapist in "Justice × 2", "Book 27" and "U Is for U.F.O.", the Archangel Michael in "A Is for Angel", the Jinn in "F Is for Fire", "Z Is for Zombies" and "I Is for IRS", Brother Paul in "S Is for Silence", Eddie in "D Is for Doll", the Winged Demon in "C Is for Cannibal", and the Manager Demon in “The Angel of Warning”
 Euan Morton voices George, Michael Cerveris voices Townsend's Devil Therapist, and Kevin Chapman voices the Manager Demon, all uncredited
 Brooklyn Shuck as Lynn Bouchard, Kristen's eldest daughter
 Skylar Gray as Lila Bouchard, Kristen's second daughter
 Maddy Crocco as Lexis Bouchard, Kristen's third daughter
 Dalya Knapp as Laura Bouchard, Kristen's youngest daughter
 Christine Lahti as Sheryl Luria, Kristen's supportive, hard-living mother
 Michael Emerson as Dr. Leland Townsend, Kristen's professional rival and an expert in the occult. He is obsessed with encouraging others to commit evil acts. He has a particular interest in David, stemming from his contempt for those who believe themselves incapable of sin. The episode "Justice × 2" reveals that he is really Jake Perry, a former insurance adjuster from Des Moines working to influence others into acts of evil.
 Ashley Edner as Abbey (season 2; guest season 3), a succubus that taunts Ben during his dreams
 Ciara Renée voices Abbey in a recurring role
 Andrea Martin as Sister Andrea (recurring season 2; season 3), a powerful nun who advises David and serves as Leland's polar opposite

Recurring
 Darren Pettie as Orson LeRoux (seasons 1–2), a convicted serial killer who is evaluated by Kristen
 Brooke Bloom as Emily LeRoux (seasons 1, 3), Orson LeRoux's wife
 Danny Burstein as Lewis Cormier (seasons 1–2), Kristen's former boss and the D.A. of Queens, New York City
 Boris McGiver as Monsignor Matthew Korecki (seasons 1–3), a distinguished priest who Kristen, David and Ben receive and report their cases to
 Sohina Sidhu as Karima Shakir, Ben's sister and a tech expert
 Clark Johnson as Father Amara (season 1), an exorcist and David's spiritual advisor
 Noah Robbins as Sebastian Lewin (season 1), a young man targeted by Leland
 Nora Murphy as Rose390 (seasons 1–2), a young girl avatar in a video game whose creator attacks David
 Karen Pittman as Caroline Hopkins (season 1), a woman on whom The Catholic Church performs an exorcism
 Nicole Shalhoub as Vanessa Dudley (seasons 1–2), one of the co-hosts of the ghost-themed reality show "Gotham Ghosts" and Ben's on-again/off-again girlfriend
 Li Jun Li as Grace Ling, a supposed doomsday prophet under investigation by The Catholic Church
 Kristen Connolly as Detective Mira Byrd (seasons 1–2), a homicide detective in the NYPD and Kristen's friend
 Patrick Brammall as Andy Bouchard, Kristen's husband, father of their daughters and a professional climbing guide who is often away from the family
 Peter Scolari as Bishop Thomas Marx (seasons 1–2), a skeptical Catholic Church official who assigns David's cases prior to his ordination. His appearances in Season 2 were some of Scolari's final performances before his death in 2021.
 Renée Elise Goldsberry as Renée Harris (seasons 1–2), a defense attorney working for The Catholic Church
 Taylor Louderman as Malindaz, a popular YouTube beauty vlogger who is one of Leland's clients
 Dylan Baker as Father Kay (season 2), one of David's teachers at The Catholic Church
 Brian Stokes Mitchell as Father Joe Mulvehill (season 2), a spiritually exhausted exorcist suffering from a crisis of faith
 Stephen Dexter as "Fry Guy" (seasons 2–3), a man that Kristen assaults after he was repeatedly rude to her, leading to the creation of a viral video
 Brian d'Arcy James as Victor LeConte (seasons 2–3), an agent of The Entity, the Vatican secret service
 Anthony DeSando as Father Rodrigo Katagas (seasons 2–3), a high-ranking member of The Congregatio pro Doctrina Fidei aka The Holy Office
 Tim Matheson as Edward Tragoren (seasons 2–3), a sinister business consultant and friend of Leland who romances Sheryl

Guest
 Dakin Matthews as Father Augustus
 John Glover as Byron Duke
 Dascha Polanco as Patti Hitchens
 Luke Judy as Eric McCrystal
 Michael Stahl-David as Tom McCrystal
 Heather Lind as Sara McCrystal
 Scott Ian as The Butcher
 Annaleigh Ashford as Bridget Farrell
 Vondie Curtis-Hall as Leon Acosta
 Jeremy Shamos as Dr. Phillip Lynch-Giles
 Jayne Houdyshell as Judge Sarah Carla Shire
 Megan Ketch as Judy James
 Gbenga Akinnagbe as Lando Mutabazi
 Brandon J. Dirden as Raymond
 Jessie Mueller as Anya
 Matilda Lawler as Matilda Mowbray
 Zuleikha Robinson as Jane Castle
 Welker White as Michele Sawyer
 Wayne Duvall as Louie Wolff
 Fredric Lehne as Mick Carr
 Corey Cott as Officer Turley
 Kenneth Tigar as Winston
 Frank Wood as Brother Jacob
 Michael Esper as Scientist
 Reed Birney as Father Thunderland
 Ato Essandoh as Nathan Katsaris
 Taylor Trensch as Mitch Otterbean
 Wallace Shawn as Father Frank Ignatius
 Ruthie Ann Miles as Dr. Beverly Swan
 Kayli Carter as Amalia
 Annie Golden as Traci
 Lena Hall as Marie Taylor
 Malina Weissman as Candice Berganza
 Michael Chernus as Dr. Paul
 Gia Crovatin as Renee
 Patrick Page as Father Luke
 Dana Gourrier as Yasmin
 Nate Mann as Henry Trezza

Episodes

Season 1 (2019–20)

Season 2 (2021)

Season 3 (2022)

Production
CBS ordered a pilot for the potential series in January 2019, created by the writing team Robert and Michelle King. Katja Herbers and Mike Colter were cast in February, with Michael Emerson and Aasif Mandvi cast in March. A series order was officially made in May 2019. A day after that, it was announced that the series would premiere in the fall of 2019 and air on Thursday nights at 10:00 p.m. during the 2019–2020 television season.

On July 18, 2019, Christine Lahti was cast as Sheryl Luria, replacing Deirdre O'Connell who was in the original pilot. On July 25, 2019, it was announced that Kurt Fuller, who guest starred in the pilot, had been promoted to a series regular. The series debuted on September 26, 2019.

On October 22, 2019, CBS renewed the series for a second season. The filming of the second season was delayed due to the COVID-19 pandemic in the United States, but later began in October 2020 and was rerouted into a more "character-focused season." Filming concluded in June 2021. On May 18, 2021, it reported that the series would move to Paramount+ for the second season. On May 23, 2021, it was announced that the second season would premiere on June 20, 2021.

On July 8, 2021, Paramount+ renewed the series for a third season which ran from June 12, 2022, to August 14, 2022. Filming for this season started on November 15, 2021, and was completed in May 2022. It consisted of 10 episodes.

On July 5, 2022, Paramount+ renewed the series for a fourth season.

Release

Marketing
On May 15, 2019, CBS released the first official trailer for the series. In September 2020, CBS announced that the first season would be made available on Netflix in October 2020 in order to generate attention for the upcoming second season. The series left Netflix in the US on October 1, 2021, due to  becoming a Paramount+ exclusive.

International broadcast
Evil premiered in Canada on Global on September 26, 2019. CBS Studios International announced on October 22, 2019, that Evil would air in Spain on Syfy in January 2020. On October 29, CBS announced Evil would be available on Globoplay in Brazil on November 1. Evil premiered in Latin America on October 31 on Universal TV through an exclusive licensing agreement between CBS Studios International and NBCUniversal International Networks.

CBS Studios International has also signed a licensing agreement with French broadcaster TF1 Group for Evil to air in France, where it premiered on May 19, 2021. In India, Evil initially premiered on the streaming service Voot Select in April 2020, followed by a network television premiere on June 23, 2020, on Zee Café. In July 2020, the British pay television channel Alibi announced that they had bought the British rights to Evil and the show premiered in the United Kingdom on September 21, 2020. In Germany, the show first premiered on the pay-TV channel ProSieben Fun on August 7, 2020, followed by a free-TV premiere on February 17, 2021, on ProSieben.

Reception

Critical response
The review aggregation website Rotten Tomatoes reported a "certified fresh" 92% approval rating based on 50 reviews, with an average rating of 7.70/10. The website's critical consensus states, "Smartly-written and effectively unsettling, Evil works best when it dares to delve into the depths of the uncomfortable questions it poses." Metacritic, which uses a weighted average, assigned a score of 76 out of 100 based on 14 critics, indicating "generally favorable reviews". The first season was named as one of the best television shows of 2019 by The New Yorker, NPR, and TVLine. In 2021, the show was named the best show on television by TV Guide.

At the 1st Critics' Choice Super Awards, the series received four nominations: Best Horror Series, Best Actor in a Horror Series (Colter, Emerson) and Best Actress in a Horror Series (Herbers).

The second season has a 95% approval rating on Rotten Tomatoes, based on 20 reviews, with an average rating of 8.80/10. The website's critical consensus reads, "Evil successfully slips into the streaming world with a spooky second season that doubles down on the scares without losing its sense of humor." On Metacritic, the second season received a score of 84 based on reviews from 10 critics, indicating "universal acclaim".

The third season has a 100% approval rating on Rotten Tomatoes, based on 10 reviews, with an average rating of 8.50/10. On Metacritic, the third season received a score of 92 based on reviews from 7 critics, indicating "universal acclaim".

Ratings

Home media
CBS Home Entertainment released the complete first season on DVD on June 30, 2020. The complete second season was released on DVD-R on June 7, 2022.

References

External links
 
 

2019 American television series debuts
2010s American drama television series
2020s American drama television series
2010s American supernatural television series
2020s American supernatural television series
American thriller television series
CBS original programming
Catholic drama television series
Demons in television
Paramount+ original programming
Television series by CBS Studios
Television series created by Robert and Michelle King
Television shows set in New York City